Niphoparmena is a genus of longhorn beetles of the subfamily Lamiinae, containing the following species:

subgenus Glabroparmena
 Niphoparmena glabricollis Breuning, 1956

subgenus Microparmena
 Niphoparmena basilewskyi Breuning, 1960

subgenus Mimamblymora
 Niphoparmena flavescens (Breuning, 1950)

subgenus Niphoparmena
 Niphoparmena acutipennis Breuning, 1956
 Niphoparmena albopilosa Aurivillius, 1908
 Niphoparmena alluaudi (Villiers, 1940)
 Niphoparmena bispinosa Aurivillius, 1903
 Niphoparmena carayoni Breuning, 1969
 Niphoparmena carinipennis Breuning, 1958
 Niphoparmena densepuncticollis Breuning, 1960
 Niphoparmena dohertyi Breuning, 1970
 Niphoparmena elgonensis (Breuning, 1939)
 Niphoparmena flavoscutellata (Breuning, 1939)
 Niphoparmena fossulata Breuning, 1942
 Niphoparmena fuscomaculata (Villiers, 1940)
 Niphoparmena fuscostriata Breuning, 1958
 Niphoparmena grossepunctata Breuning, 1942
 Niphoparmena jeanneli (Villiers, 1940)
 Niphoparmena kenyensis (Breuning, 1939)
 Niphoparmena kivuensis (Breuning, 1939)
 Niphoparmena latifrons (Breuning, 1940)
 Niphoparmena leleupi Breuning, 1960
 Niphoparmena lindblomi Aurivillius, 1925
 Niphoparmena longespinipennis Breuning, 1970 
 Niphoparmena longicornis (Breuning, 1939)
 Niphoparmena meruana Aurivillius, 1908
 Niphoparmena mycerinoides (Breuning, 1939)
 Niphoparmena obliquefasciata (Breuning, 1939)
 Niphoparmena persimilis (Breuning, 1939)
 Niphoparmena puncticollis (Villiers, 1940)
 Niphoparmena rougemonti Breuning, 1977
 Niphoparmena scotti (Breuning, 1939)
 Niphoparmena spinipennis (Breuning, 1939)
 Niphoparmena sublineata (Villiers, 1940)
 Niphoparmena truncatipennis Breuning, 1956
 Niphoparmena unicolor (Breuning, 1940)

subgenus Trichoparmena
 Niphoparmena abyssinica (Breuning, 1940)
 Niphoparmena convexa (Breuning, 1939)
 Niphoparmena cylindrica (Breuning, 1940)
 Niphoparmena densepunctata (Breuning, 1940)
 Niphoparmena elongata (Breuning, 1939)
 Niphoparmena elongatipennis Breuning, 1961
 Niphoparmena flavostictica (Villiers, 1940)
 Niphoparmena gracilis (Breuning, 1940)
 Niphoparmena kenyana (Breuning, 1940)
 Niphoparmena marmorata Breuning, 1961
 Niphoparmena minima (Breuning, 1939)

References

 
Morimopsini